GTV is a commercial television station in Melbourne, Australia, owned by the Nine Network.  The station is currently based at studios at 717 Bourke Street, Docklands.

History

GTV-9 was amongst the first television stations to begin regular transmission in Australia. Test transmissions began on 27 September 1956, introduced by former 3DB radio announcer Geoff Corke, based at the Mount Dandenong transmitter, as the studios in Richmond were not yet ready. The station covered the 1956 Summer Olympics which Melbourne hosted., the 1956 Carols By Candlelight and the Davis Cup tennis as part of its test transmissions.

The station was officially opened on 19 January 1957 by Victorian Governor 
Sir Dallas Brooks from the studios in Bendigo Street, Richmond. A clip from the ceremony has featured in a number of GTV-9 retrospectives, in which the Governor advises viewers that if they did not like the programs, they could just turn off.

The Richmond building, bearing the name Television City, had been converted from a Heinz tinned food factory, also occupied in the past by the Wertheim Piano Company (from 1908 to 1935). A cornerstone, now visible from the staff canteen courtyard, was laid when construction of the Piano factory began.

Eric Pearce was appointed senior newsreader in the late 1960s, after having been the first newsreader at rival station HSV-7.  He held that position for almost twenty years. In 1957, GTV-9's first large-scale production was the nightly variety show In Melbourne Tonight ("IMT"), hosted by Graham Kennedy.  Kennedy was a radio announcer at 3UZ in Melbourne before being 'discovered' by GTV-9 producer Norm Spencer, when appearing on a GTV-9 telethon.  Bert Newton moved from HSV-7 to join Kennedy. IMT continued for thirteen years, dominating Melbourne's television scene for most of that time. It set a precedent for a number of subsequent live variety programmes from the station.

Ownership has changed over the decades. The station was first licensed to the General Television Corporation Ltd., a consortium of two newspapers, The Argus and The Age, together with cinema chains Hoyts, Greater Union, Sir Arthur Warner's Electronic Industries, JC William's Theatres, Cinesound Productions, and radio stations 3XY, 3UZ, 3KZ. In early 1957 The Argus was acquired by The Herald and Weekly Times Ltd, and the paper was closed on the same day that GTV-9 officially opened. The Herald in turn sold its interests in the station to Electronic Industries, later acquired by UK television manufacturer Pye, in 1960. Because of the restriction on foreign ownership of television stations, GTV-9 was then sold to Frank Packer's Australian Consolidated Press, which already owned TCN-9 in Sydney, resulting in the formation of the country's first commercially owned television network. Prior to this GTV-9 was affiliated with ATN-7 in Sydney.  Son Clyde Packer ran the network for some time, until a falling out led to a handover to younger son Kerry Packer. In the 1980s the network was sold to Alan Bond, but later bought back at a much lower price.
Following the death of Kerry Packer, his son James Packer progressively sold down his stake in the network. (See also Publishing and Broadcasting Limited.)

Along with most Australian TV stations, GTV-9 commenced colour test transmissions in October, 1974. The official changeover took place at 12.00am on Saturday 1 March 1975. In 1976, GTV-9 became the first Australian television station to commence permanent 24-hour transmission. In 2001 the station commenced digital television broadcasting, in line with most other metropolitan stations. GTV-9 continued broadcasting in analogue on VHF9, with a digital simulcast on VHF8.

In 2010 it was announced to public and then staff, that after 54 years at Bendigo Street, GTV-9 would move day-to-day operations including News and commercial sales to 717 Bourke Street, Docklands. On 25 October 2010, it was announced that GTV-9 would begin producing larger scale studio productions, such as The Footy Show, Hey Hey its Saturday, and Millionaire Hotseat from the new Docklands Studios Melbourne.

On 28 February 2011, GTV-9 broadcast its final live program – the 6pm edition of Nine News – from the Richmond Television City studios, and the following day began broadcasting news bulletins from 717 Bourke Street.  Also while their new fibre link to their transmission site was being completed, a temporary DVB-S2 link was put up on Optus D1, which ceased at the end of the year.

In 2012, no new programming has been produced out of the new studios. The network opted to move  A Current Affair and its host Tracy Grimshaw to TCN-9 in Sydney.

In May 2012, a lower powered permanent backup DVB-S2 link for their transmission site was re-established on Optus D1, which requires at least a two-metre solid receiving dish.

Digital multiplex

Programming

Locally produced programs by or with GTV-9 Melbourne.

Current

717 Bourke Street
Nine News Melbourne  (1957–present)
Nine Afternoon News Melbourne (2017–present)
Nine News: First at Five (Weekends, 2014–present) 
TAC Cup Future Stars (2009–present)
The AFL Sunday Footy Show (1993–present)
Footy Classified (2007–present)

Docklands Studios Melbourne – Stage 5
Millionaire Hot Seat (2009–present) – previously filmed in Studio 9

Other Location
Lego Masters (2019–present)
The Block (2011–2012, 2014–present) 
Australian Ninja Warrior (2019–present)
Family Food Fight  (2017–2018)
Postcards (1998–present)
Paramedics (2018–present)
Bad Mothers  (2019–present)
Carols by Candlelight (1972–present)

Sport
Suncorp Super Netball coverage (2017–present)
NRL coverage: Melbourne Storm
Australian Open coverage (2019–present)
French Open and US Open tennis coverage (2021–present and 2022–present, respectively)
AFL (2002–2006)

Past 

2010s
Nine News Victoria (March 2017 – June 2021, commissioned for affiliate GLV/BCV in regional Victoria, weeknights only) replaced by WIN News from July 2021.
Weakest Link (2021)
Your Domain (2019–2020)
Talkin' 'Bout Your Generation (2009–2012 on Ten, 2018–2019 on Nine)
The Logies (various years from 1959–present)
House Husbands (2012–2017)
Underbelly (2008–2009, 2013) 
A Current Affair (2008–2011) (production moved back to TCN Sydney)
This Is Your Life (2011) (previous produced at TCN Sydney)
The Million Dollar Drop  (2011)
Between the Lines  (2011)
Ben Elton Live From Planet Earth (2011)

2000s
20 to 1 (2005–2010)
Who Wants to Be a Millionaire? New Zealand (2008–2010) – The show was tapped at GTV set for New Zealand Viewers.
Australia's Funniest Home Videos: Daily Edition (2009–2010)
The Singing Bee (2007–2009)
Here's Humphrey  (2008–2009) (Previously Adelaide)
Temptation (2005–2009)
Underbelly series 1 (2008)
Canal Road (2008)
Million Dollar Wheel of Fortune (2008)
Power of 10 (2008)
Hole in the Wall (2008)
The Mint (2007–2008)
1 vs. 100 (2007)(Filmed at the Central City Studios at Melbourne Docklands but managed by GTV-9)
The Nation (2007)
Kids’ WB Australia (2006–2019)
Quizmania (2006–2007)
Bert's Family Feud (2006–2007)
Shopping for Love (2005–2007)
Comedy Inc (in part, 2003–2007)
Magda's Funny Bits (2006)
Any Given Sunday (AFL Chat Show) (2005–2006)
Celebrity Golf Shoot-Out (2005–2006)
StarStruck (2005)
Australia's Funniest Home Video Show (2000–2004) (production returned to Sydney in 2005)
Micallef Tonight (2003)
Test Australia: The National IQ Test (2002–2003)
Shafted (2002)
Pass the Buck (2002)
Surprise, Surprise (2000–2001)
Russell Gilbert Live (2000)

1990s
Pig's Breakfast (1999–2000)
Who Wants to Be a Millionaire? (1999–2007)
Stingers (1998–2004)
The Russell Gilbert Show (1998)
Burgo's Catch Phrase (1997–2001, 2002–2004)
This is Your Life (1995–2005, 2011)
Don't Forget Your Toothbrush (LIVE) (1995)
The Footy Show (AFL) (1994–2019) – previously filmed in Studio 9
The Price Is Right (1993–1998, 2003–2005)
The Bob Morrison Show (1994)
Banjo Paterson's The Man From Snowy River: The McGregor Saga (1993–1996)
Saturday at Rick’s (1992–1993)
Chances (1991–1992)
All Together Now (1991–1993)

1980s
The Flying Doctors (1986–1993)
Sale of the Century (1980–2001)

1970s
The Don Lane Show (1975–1983)
The Ernie Sigley Show (1974–1976, 1985)
The Graham Kennedy Show (1972–1975)
A Current Affair (1971–1978)
Hey Hey It's Saturday (October 1971 – December 1977, February 1979 – 20 November 1999 (Finale), 2009 (Reunion), April 2010 – November 2010)
The Sullivans (1976–1983)
The Daryl and Ossie Cartoon Show (1977)
Cartoon Corner (1971-1976)
No Man's Land (1973-1976)

1957 – 1960s
The Big Game (1966)
New Faces (Australian) (1963–1985)
World Championship Wrestling (1964–1978)
In Melbourne Tonight (1957–1970, 1996–1998)
The Tarax Show (1957–1969)
Boomerang (1961–1962)
It Could Be You (1961–1969) 
The Adventures of Gerry Gee 
Concentration
Toddy Time (1961)
Let Me Read to You (1961)
Bongo (1960)
The Bert Newton Show (1959–1960)
On the Spot (1959–1960)
Geoff and Judy (1959) with Geoff Corke and Judy Jack 
The Astor Show (1958)
Face the Nation (1958–1959)
Keeping Company (1958–1959)
Personal Album (1958–1959)
The Peters Club with Rod McLennan, Judy Banks & Joff Ellen 
The Shirley Abicair Show (1958 series of specials, 2 of the 9 episodes were produced by GTV)
Anything Goes (1957)
Do You Trust Your Wife? (1957–1958)
Eric Welch's Sports Album (1957)
Football Inquest (1957, not to be confused with 1960–1974 HSV-7 series)
The Happy Go Lucky Show (1957–1959)
Hillbilly Requests (1957–1958)
The Jack Perry Show (1957)
Juke Box Saturday Night (1957–1958)
Lovely to Look At (1957)
Mannequin Parade (1957)
Neptune Presents (1957)
Open House (1957–1958)
Thursday at One (1957–1960)
Raising a Husband (1957)
 Studio 9 was used as the primary studio.

News 

The station's evening news bulletin, Nine News Melbourne is presented by Peter Hitchener from Monday to Thursday and Alicia Loxley from Friday to Sunday. Sport is presented by Tony Jones on weeknights and Clint Stanaway on weekends and weather is presented by Livinia Nixon from Monday to Thursday and Madeline Spark from Friday to Sunday.

Alicia Loxley is the fill-in news presenter for Peter Hitchener on weeknights, with Dougal Beatty being the fill-in presenter for Alicia Loxley on weekends. Madeline Spark presents the weather in place of Livinia Nixon.

Nine News Melbourne is produced locally from Nine's Melbourne studios and is also simulcast on Light FM and streamed online. Nine News national bulletins (Nine Early Morning News, Nine Morning News and Nine News Now) are produced from Sydney although late newsbreaks at the weekend are produced from Melbourne and presented by Alicia Loxley.

In May 2017, the station launched its first local afternoon news bulletin, Nine Afternoon News Melbourne, putting it head to head with rival station HSV-7's local afternoon news. The bulletin is presented by Alicia Loxley (Monday & Tuesday) and Dougal Beatty (Wednesday-Friday).

Presenters
News presenters

 Peter Hitchener (Monday – Thursday, 1998–present)
 Alicia Loxley (Friday – Sunday, 2011–present)

Sports presenters

Weeknights
 Tony Jones (Weeknights, 1990–present)

Weekends
 Clint Stanaway (Weekends, 2011–present) 

Weather presenters

 Livinia Nixon (weeknights, 2004–present)
 Madeline Spark (weekends, 2020–present)

Reporters

 Christine Ahern (Today Melbourne reporter)
 Seb Costello (A Current Affair reporter)
 Jo Hall 
 Dougal Beatty
 Alexis Daish (A Current Affair reporter)
 Emily Rice (Health reporter)
 Madeline Spark
 Justine Conway
 Eliza Rugg 
 Allan Raskall
 Neary Ty
 Izabella Staskowski (Today Melbourne reporter)
 Adam Hegarty
 Reid Butler
 Brett McLeod (Europe correspondent) 
 Elisabeth Moss
 Heidi Murphy
 Stephanie Anderson
 Mark Santomartino (State Political reporter)
 Lana Murphy 
 Penelope Liersch
 Gillian Lantouris
 Mimi Becker
 Shuba Krishnan

Sports Reporters
 Alicia Muling
 Braden Ingram
 Joshua Dawe
 Natalie Yoannidis 

Fill-in Presenters

 Dougal Beatty (News)
 Justine Conway (Weather)
 Stephanie Anderson (Weather)

Former presenters 
Eric Pearce, who was knighted after his retirement, was GTV-9's chief news presenter from the late 1950s until 1974. After his first retirement, the subsequent American style "NewsCentre Nine"  presented by Peter Hitchener did not rate well, so Pearce was persuaded to return in 1976, remaining until 1978.

In 1978, former HSV-7 news presenter Brian Naylor joined as GTV-9's chief weeknight news presenter, with Hitchener on weekends. Naylor's association with Nine lasted 20 years – he retired at the end of 1998, with Naylor replaced by then deputy news presenter Peter Hitchener. Jo Hall took over on weekends, with Tony Jones the main weekend fill-in.

Other main presenters of Nine News Melbourne included Tracy Grimshaw (1981–1993), who has since moved to A Current Affair and Tracey Curro, who also worked on Nine's 60 Minutes and Jo Hall (1998–2011).

Past weekend sport presenters in recent years have included Leith Mulligan (1999–2006), Heath O'Loughlin (2006–2008), Grant Hackett (2008–2009) and Lisa Andrews (2009–2011). Rob Gell was the previous weather presenter he held the position for fifteen years from 1988 to 2004.

See also 
 Television broadcasting in Australia

References

External links 
 
 GTV-9 1956 – 1976  Archive Photos and Stories of the early days

Nine Network
Television stations in Melbourne
Television channels and stations established in 1957